Polmak Church is a parish church of the Church of Norway in Deatnu-Tana Municipality in Troms og Finnmark county, Norway. It is located in the village of Polmak, just east of the border with Finland. It is one of the churches for the Tana parish which is part of the Indre Finnmark prosti (deanery) in the Diocese of Nord-Hålogaland. The white, wooden church was built in a long church style in 1853 using plans drawn up by the architect J.H. Nebelong. The church seats about 120 people.

History
In 1847, the King authorized the construction of a new church in Polmak. The church was consecrated on 27 March 1853 by the local Provost Søren Christian Sommerfelt. The church is one of the few in Finnmark that were not burned by the retreating German army near the end of World War II. By the end of the war, the church was in need of repairs, so the Riksantikvaren commissioned Trond Dancke to renovate and improve the building in 1959. The entryway was rebuilt and the nave was expanded as well during this renovation.

In 2014, the former parish of Polmak was merged into the parish of Tana. Prior to that time, Polmak parish was made up of one church, after the merger, the new Tana parish included three churches.

See also
List of churches in Nord-Hålogaland

References

Tana, Norway
Churches in Finnmark
Wooden churches in Norway
19th-century Church of Norway church buildings
Churches completed in 1853
1853 establishments in Norway
Long churches in Norway